The 1928 Kansas Jayhawks football team represented the University of Kansas in the Big Six Conference during the 1928 college football season. In their first season under head coach Bill Hargiss, the Jayhawks compiled a 4–4 record (2–3 against conference opponents), finished in fifth place in the conference, and were outscored by opponents by a combined total of 66 to 34. They played their home games at Memorial Stadium in Lawrence, Kansas. Harold Hauser was the team captain.

Schedule

References

Kansas
Kansas Jayhawks football seasons
Kansas Jayhawks football